Hempstead may refer to:

Places

England
Hempstead, Essex
Hempstead, Kent
Hempstead, near Holt, Norfolk
Hempstead, near Stalham, Norfolk
Hemel Hempstead, Hertfordshire

United States
Hempstead, New York (disambiguation), multiple places in New York named Hempstead
Hempstead, Texas
Hempstead County, Arkansas
Hempstead High School (disambiguation), several high schools

Other uses
USS Hempstead, the name of more than one proposed United States Navy ship

People with the surname
Edward Hempstead (1780–1817), American lawyer and pioneer
Harry Hempstead (1868–1938), American owner of the New York Giants from 1912 to 1919
Hessley Hempstead (1972–2021), American football player
Isaac William Hempstead (Isaac Hempstead Wright, born 1999), English actor
Stephen P. Hempstead (1812–1883), American politician

See also
Heemstede, North Holland
Hempsted, Gloucester, England
Hemsted Park, Kent, England – historically sometimes known as Hempsted Park
Hamstead (disambiguation)
Hampstead (disambiguation)
Homestead (disambiguation)